Horizon is an upcoming American epic Western film co-written, produced, directed by and starring Kevin Costner. Alongside him are Sienna Miller, Sam Worthington, Luke Wilson and Thomas Haden Church. Three sequels have also been greenlit, with the first to begin filming in Spring 2023.

Premise
Set in pre and post-American Civil War depicting the expansion of the American west.

Cast

Production
It was announced in January 2022 that Kevin Costner was set to direct and produce the film, a passion project for him, in addition to starring. It began casting in February. In April, Warner Bros. and New Line Cinema joined the production to distribute. In a June interview, Costner stated he plans to make four movies out of the premise, and was looking to cast over 170 speaking roles. In August, Sienna Miller, Sam Worthington, Jamie Campbell Bower, Luke Wilson, Thomas Haden Church, Jena Malone, Alejandro Edda, Tatanka Means and Michael Rooker were cast in the film. Isabelle Fuhrman, Ella Hunt, Jeff Fahey and Tom Payne would be amongst numerous casting announcements made throughout September.<ref>{{Cite web |last=D'Alessandro |first=Anthony |date=September 9, 2022 |title='Lady Chatterley's Lover Actress Ella Hunt Boards Kevin Costner Western Horizon |url=https://deadline.com/2022/09/kevin-costner-horizon-ella-hunt-1235113074/ |url-status=live |archive-url=https://web.archive.org/web/20220909191331/https://deadline.com/2022/09/kevin-costner-horizon-ella-hunt-1235113074/ |archive-date=9 September 2022 |access-date=9 September 2022 |website=Deadline Hollywood}}</ref> In October, Will Patton, Owen Crow Shoe and Danny Huston were added to the cast.

Filming began on August 29, 2022 in southern Utah, concluding in November.

 Music 

The film's official score was composed by American-Turkish rock band HIV and composer Lisbeth Scott.

Sequels
In June 2022, Costner stated he plans to make four Horizon'' films in total, shot back-to-back. In November 2022, Costner confirmed that the first film had been completed, and that the second had been greenlit, set to be filmed in Spring 2023.

References

External links
 

Upcoming films
American Civil War films
American Western (genre) films
Films directed by Kevin Costner
Films shot in Utah
New Line Cinema films
Upcoming English-language films
Warner Bros. films
2020s Western (genre) films